About to Choke is a 1996 album by Vic Chesnutt, an American singer/songwriter and multi-instrumentalist who was known for his raw, expressive vocals. It was his fifth album overall and his first for a major label. It was released by Capitol Records, and was reissued, in 2010, by Plain Recordings. In 2019, Discogs included About to Choke on its list of the 35 Saddest Albums of All Time.

Track listing
All songs written by Vic Chesnutt
 "Myrtle" – 3:09
 "New Town" – 4:09
 "Ladle" – 4:06
 "Tarragon" – 2:00
 "Swelters" – 3:51
 "(It's No Secret) Satisfaction" – 1:02
 "Little Vacation" – 3:43
 "Degenerate" – 4:23
 "Hot Seat" – 3:39
 "Giant Sands" – 3:40
 "Threads" – 4:23
 "See You Around" – 7:19

Personnel
Vic Chesnutt: vocals, guitars (acoustic, electric and classical), keyboards, piano, synthesizers, harmonica
Tina Chesnutt: bass guitar
Jimmy Davidson: acoustic guitar
John DeVries: lead guitar, bass guitar
Alex McManus: acoustic and lead guitar
Mark La Falce: guitars, drums, percussion, vocals

References 

1996 albums
Vic Chesnutt albums
Capitol Records albums